KVMA-FM (102.9 MHz) is an urban adult contemporary formatted radio station based in Shreveport, Louisiana, and serving the "Ark-La-Tex" region.  Broadcasting on 102.9 FM, KVMA-FM is owned by Cumulus Media and is headquartered at the Louisiana Boardwalk shopping center in Bossier City, Louisiana.

KVMA-FM was purchased in 2004 from Magnolia, Arkansas and relocated to the Shreveport Market on 107.9 MHz with Cumulus Broadcasting. In 2005, a short discussion between the FCC, Barksdale Air Force Base and Cumulus Broadcasting over the interference of 107.9 and the B52 Aircraft, the FCC shut down the 107.9 frequency forever in the Shreveport/Bossier area. Cumulus Broadcasting shutdown KVMA-FM and relocated its format to 102.9 one evening and temporarily shutdown KBED-FM (Mix 102.9 FM). KVMA-FM picked up the syndication rights to the Dede In The Morning   It is also the home of The D.L. Hughley Show in the afternoons, and The Sweat Hotel at nights. KBED-FM is now KQHN-FM and was relicensed to 97.3 and serves the Ark-La-Tex area.

KVMA-FM transmitter facilities are located near Downtown Shreveport on a Landmark non supported structure nicknamed Eiffel Tower. It is co-located with KMJJ-FM and KQHN-FM with the KRMD-FM auxiliary transmitter.

External links
KVMA-FM official website

Radio stations in Louisiana
Urban adult contemporary radio stations in the United States
Cumulus Media radio stations
Shreveport, Louisiana
Magnolia, Arkansas